W. J. Hamilton may refer to:

 Wendy J. Hamilton, American anti-drink drive campaigner
 William (John) Hamilton (1805–1867), English geologist
 William J. Hamilton, (born 1932), American Democratic Party politician from New Jersey
 W. J. W. Hamilton (1825–1883), New Zealand public servant and part-owner of the Lyttelton Times

See also
Hamilton (surname)